The Communauté de communes des Monts et de l'Andelle  was located in the Seine-Maritime département of the Normandy région of north-western France. It was created in January 2003. It was merged into the new Communauté de communes des 4 rivières in January 2017.

Participants 
The Communauté de communes comprised the following 15 communes:

Argueil
Beauvoir-en-Lyons
La Chapelle-Saint-Ouen
Croisy-sur-Andelle
La Feuillie
Fry
La Hallotière
La Haye
Le Héron
Hodeng-Hodenger
Mésangueville
Le Mesnil-Lieubray
Morville-sur-Andelle
Nolléval
Sigy-en-Bray

See also
Communes of the Seine-Maritime department

References 

Monts et de l'Andelle